Sir Charles Bruce Locker Tennyson  (8 November 1879 – 22 June 1977) was a grandson of the poet Alfred Lord Tennyson, a civil servant, an industrialist, and an academic of his grandfather.

Tennyson was the son of the Hon. Lionel Tennyson and his wife Eleanor Bertha Mary, daughter of Frederick Locker. His father was the younger son of Alfred, Lord Tennyson. He was educated at Eton College and King's College, Cambridge, where he gained a first in Part I of the Law Tripos and was a Whewell Scholar in 1903. In 1909, he married Ivy Gladys OBE (née Pretious). They had three sons, two of whom were killed during the Second World War:

 Frederick Penrose Tennyson, known as Pen (26 August 1912 – 7 July 1941)
 Charles Julian Tennyson (7 February 1915 – 7 March 1945)
 Beryl Hallam Augustine Tennyson (10 December 1920 – 21 December 2005), radio producer and father of:
 Charles Jonathan Penrose Tennyson (born 11 May 1955), a physicist
 Sita Rosalind Joanna Tennyson (born 28 April 1950), social innovator and consultant

He was awarded CMG in the 1915 New Year Honours and knighted in 1945.

References 

1879 births
1977 deaths
People educated at Eton College
Alumni of King's College, Cambridge
British civil servants
British industrialists
Companions of the Order of St Michael and St George
Charles